John Bell (born 30 August 1949) is a former Australian rules footballer who played with Collingwood in the Victorian Football League (VFL).

Notes

External links 
 
 

Australian rules footballers from Victoria (Australia)
Collingwood Football Club players
1949 births

Living people